Acutotyphlops banaorum is a species of snake in the family Typhlopidae. The species is endemic to the Philippines.

Etymology
The specific name, banaorum, refers to the Banao, a tribe indigenous to northern Luzon island.

Geographic range
A. banaorum is found in the province of Kalinga, which is on the island of Luzon, in the Philippines.

Habitat
The preferred natural habitats of A. banaorum are forest, shrubland, and grassland.

Behavior
A. banaorum is fossorial.

Reproduction
A. banaorum is oviparous.

References

Further reading
Wallach V, Brown RM, Diesmos AC, Gee GVA (2007). "An Enigmatic New Species of Blind Snake from Luzon Island, Northern Philippines, with a Synopsis of the Genus Acutotyphlops (Serpentes: Typhlopidae)". Journal of Herpetology 41 (4); 690–702. (Acutotyphlops banaorum, new species).
Weinell JL, Hooper E, Leviton AE, Brown RM (2019). "Illustrated Key to the Snakes of the Philippines". Proceedings of the California Academy of Sciences, Fourth Series 66 (1): 1–49.

Acutotyphlops
Reptiles described in 2007

Endemic fauna of the Philippines